The Central District of Maraveh Tappeh County is a district (bakhsh) in Maraveh Tappeh County, Golestan Province, Iran. At the 2006 census, its population was 23,766, in 4,604 families.  The District has one city: Maraveh Tappeh. The District has two rural districts (dehestan): Maraveh Tappeh Rural District and Palizan Rural District.

References 

Districts of Golestan Province
Maraveh Tappeh County